Snowman is an independent video game developer and publisher best known for Alto's Adventure (2015). The three-person, Toronto-based team previously worked on productivity apps before starting work on the game in 2012. In the snowboarding endless runner game, the player taps the touchscreen to make the on-screen character jump and perform tricks through procedurally generated landscapes. It released to universal acclaim on iOS, Android, and Windows platforms. Reviewers praised its art style and aesthetics but criticized its gameplay as unoriginal.

In March 2016, Snowman announced Where Cards Fall, a collaboration designer Sam Rosenthal and his game studio The Game Band. Snowman will also publish DISTANT, a game created by the two-person team at Slingshot & Satchel. The game is confirmed for release on Windows, Mac, Apple TV, and home consoles. The studio released Alto's Odyssey, the sequel to Alto's Adventure, in 2018.

Games published

References

External links 

 

Indie video game developers
Video game companies of Canada
Video game publishers
Companies based in Toronto
Canadian companies established in 2012
Video game companies established in 2012
2012 establishments in Ontario